Dean F. Clukey (born January 4, 1936) is an American politician from Maine. Clukey served as a Republican State Senator from Maine's 34th District, representing much of central and southern Aroostook County, including the population centers of Houlton, Fort Fairfield and Presque Isle. He was first elected to the Maine Senate in 2004 after serving from 1992 to 1998 in the Maine House of Representatives. He obtained a B.A. from the now-defunct Ricker College in Houlton. He was replaced in the Senate by fellow Republican Roger Sherman in 2006 after one term in office.

He was first elected to office in 1974 as a school board member of School Administrative District (SAD) 4.

References

1936 births
Living people
Republican Party Maine state senators
Republican Party members of the Maine House of Representatives
People from Aroostook County, Maine
People from Dexter, Maine
Ricker College alumni
School board members in Maine
21st-century American politicians